Stylosanthes humilis, the Townsville stylo, is a species of flowering plant in the family Fabaceae, native to the New World Tropics, and widely introduced as a forage to the tropics of Africa, India, Southeast Asia, Malesia, and Australia. A nutritionally valuable forage plant, it was nearly wiped out in Australia in the 1970s by an outbreak of the fungus Colletotrichum gloeosporioides, which causes anthracnose disease.

References

humilis
Forages
Flora of Mexico
Flora of Central America
Flora of Cuba
Flora of the Venezuelan Antilles
Flora of Colombia
Flora of northern South America
Flora of Brazil
Flora of Paraguay
Plants described in 1824
Flora without expected TNC conservation status